László Szuszkó is a Hungarian sprint canoer who competed in the late 1990s. He won three gold medals at the ICF Canoe Sprint World Championships with two in the C-4 500 m (1997, 1998) and one in the C-4 1000 m (1998) events .

References

Hungarian male canoeists
Living people
Year of birth missing (living people)
ICF Canoe Sprint World Championships medalists in Canadian
20th-century Hungarian people